Huish Episcopi Academy is a mixed secondary school located in Huish Episcopi near Langport, Somerset, England. Huish Episcopi has the academy status and has done since 2010. It is a state secondary school for pupils ages 11 to 16. The academy also has a Sixth Form for Further Education (16+).

The school has a specialist status as a Science College, Language College and Applied Learning College. In 2017 it had 1,508 students. A range of subjects are offered, including Design Technology in Food, Textiles, and Resistant Materials, Modern Foreign Languages, and Information Technology and computer science .

History
The academy can be traced back to 6 December 1675 when the original grammar school was created by Will of Thomas Gillett.

Ofsted inspections
The Ofsted inspection in March 2007 gave the school, prior to its conversion to an academy, an overall grade of "Outstanding".
In September 2012, the academy was inspected and its rating was downgraded to good.

In January 2023, its rating was downgraded to inadequate in all areas. A new temporary headteacher was appointed and the school will join a national academy chain.

Notable alumni
Alice Temperley, fashion designer

References

External links 
 

Academies in Somerset
Secondary schools in Somerset